Savana is a town and commune in Madagascar. It belongs to the district of Vohipeno, which is a part of Vatovavy-Fitovinany Region. The population of the commune was estimated to be approximately 4,000 in the 2001 commune census.

Only primary schooling is not available. The majority (99% of the population) of the commune are farmers.  The most important crop is rice, while other important products are coffee, lychee and cassava. Services provide employment for 0.1% of the population. Additionally, fishing employs 25% of the population.

References and notes 

Populated places in Vatovavy-Fitovinany